Bradley Roby (born May 1, 1992) is an American football cornerback for the New Orleans Saints of the National Football League (NFL). He was drafted by the Denver Broncos in the first round of the 2014 NFL Draft. He played college football at Ohio State. He has also played for the Houston Texans.

Early years
A native of Suwanee, Georgia, Roby attended Peachtree Ridge High School, where he was an All-State receiver and defensive back for the Lions program. He recorded 42 tackles and six interceptions along with 29 receptions for 526 yards as a senior. He scored 11 touchdowns: five on receptions, two on punt returns and one each via a rush and kick, interception and a fumble return. He was a four-time school scholar-athlete. He was also a standout basketball player.

In addition to football, Roby was on the school's track & field team. He won the 100 meters at the 2009 Region 7 AAAAA Championships, with a career-best time of 10.72 seconds, and also finished third in the 200 meters with a career-best time of 22.49 seconds. He also competed in long jump.

Regarded as a three-star recruit by ESPN.com, Roby was listed as the No. 42 athlete in the nation in 2010. Roby initially planned to sign his national letter of intent to play wide receiver at Vanderbilt, but later decided to change his mind after receiving interest from Ohio State to play defensive back.

College career
Roby attended Ohio State University from 2010 to 2013. After redshirting the 2010 season as a true freshman, Roby stepped up and started all 13 games at cornerback in 2011. He was tied for the team lead with three interceptions and also recorded 47 tackles. In 2012, Roby was the only defensive player in the nation in 2012 to score touchdowns three different ways (recovered a fumbled punt in the end zone vs. Miami; he recovered a blocked punt in the end zone vs. Indiana; and he intercepted a pass vs. Nebraska and returned it for a touchdown). He was named a second-team All-American by the Associated Press, and first-team All-Big Ten while leading the nation in passes defended with 19. He added 63 tackles and two interceptions. In 2013, he was named first-team All-Big Ten after recording 69 tackles, 16 passes defended (T3rd in the Big Ten), three interceptions and two blocked punts.

On November 20, 2013, Ohio State head coach Urban Meyer announced that Roby would be leaving school early to enter the 2014 NFL Draft.

Professional career
Roby was projected to be a first or second round pick in the 2013 NFL Draft, but chose to instead return for his junior season. Roby was unable to participate in Senior Bowl or 2014 East–West Shrine Game after suffering a knee injury in December. He was one of 59 collegiate defensive backs to attend the NFL Scouting Combine in Indianapolis, Indiana. Roby completed nearly all of the combine drills, but chose to skip the three-cone drill. He finished third among all defensive backs in the 40-yard dash, tied for fifth in the short shuttle, tied for 11th in the vertical jump, and tied for 13th in the bench press. On March 7, 2014, Roby attended Ohio State's pro day and opted to stand on his combine numbers and only perform coverage drills and the three-cone drill. Team representatives and scouts from all 32 teams attended Ohio State's pro day. On April 22, 2014, he was charged with operating a vehicle under the influence (See Personal life). During the draft process, Roby had private meetings and workouts with multiple teams, including the San Diego Chargers, Pittsburgh Steelers, Buffalo Bills, Detroit Lions, and Cincinnati Bengals. At the conclusion of the pre-draft process, Roby was projected to be a first or early second round pick by NFL draft experts and scouts. He was ranked the fourth-best cornerback prospect by NFL analyst Mike Mayock, was ranked the fifth-best cornerback in the draft by NFLDraftScout.com, and was ranked the seventh-best cornerback by Sports Illustrated.

Denver Broncos
The Denver Broncos selected Roby in the first round (31st overall) of the 2014 NFL Draft. He was the fifth cornerback selected in 2014. Head coach John Fox stated Roby likely fell due to character concerns. Prior to his OVI charge, Roby attended pre-draft visit with the Cincinnati Bengals and was told that they were going to select him with the 24th overall pick. He also received major interest from the San Diego Chargers after meeting with them multiple times. Both teams passed on him and drafted other cornerbacks. The Chargers selected TCU cornerback Jason Verrett (25th overall) and the Bengals drafted Michigan State cornerback Darqueze Dennard (24th overall).

2014
On June 10, 2014, the Denver Broncos signed Roby to a four-year, $6.95 million contract that includes $5.58 million guaranteed and a signing bonus of $3.37 million.

Throughout training camp, he competed against Chris Harris Jr., Tony Carter, and Kayvon Webster for the starting cornerback role. Head coach John Fox named Roby the third cornerback on the depth chart to start the 2014 season, behind veterans Aqib Talib and Chris Harris Jr.

He made his professional regular season debut in the Denver Broncos' season-opener against the Indianapolis Colts and recorded a season-high seven solo tackles and three pass deflections during their 31–24 victory. Roby also made a key deflection while covering Reggie Wayne in the fourth quarter to seal the victory for the Broncos. In Week 6, Roby made three combined tackles, two pass deflections, and had his first career sack on New York Jets' quarterback Geno Smith in the Broncos' 31–17 victory. On November 2, 2014, Roby recorded two combined tackles, two pass deflections, a forced fumble, and had his first career interception off a pass attempt by New England Patriots' quarterback Tom Brady in the Broncos' 43–21 loss. The following week, he collected four combined tackles, defended two passes, and intercepted Derek Carr during a 41–17 win against the Oakland Raiders. On November 23, 2014, Roby earned his first career start and had four solo tackles and a pass deflection during a 39–36 victory against the Miami Dolphins.

The Denver Broncos finished first in the AFC West with a 12–4 record, clinching a playoff berth. On January 11, 2015, Roby appeared in his first career playoff game and recorded two solo tackles, a pass deflection, and intercepted Andrew Luck during a 24–13 loss to the Indianapolis Colts in the AFC Divisional round. The Broncos and head coach John Fox agreed to part ways during the offseason.

2015

Head coach Gary Kubiak named Roby the starting nickelback and the third cornerback on the team behind Aqib Talib and Chris Harris Jr to begin the regular season.

In Week 2, Roby returned a fumble by Jamaal Charles for a touchdown in the final seconds of the fourth quarter to give the Broncos a 31–24 victory over the Kansas City Chiefs. The following week, he made two solo tackles, deflected a pass, and intercepted Matthew Stafford during the Broncos' 24–12 victory at the Detroit Lions. On December 20, 2015, Roby tied his season-high with five solo tackles in a 34–27 loss at the Pittsburgh Steelers. He finished the  season with 40 combined tackles (34 solo), ten pass deflections, an interception, and a fumble recovery in 16 games and four starts. The Broncos' secondary ranked first in overall grade by Pro Football Focus and was named the "No Fly Zone". Roby received an overall grade of 81.0 by PFF in 2015.

The Denver Broncos finished first in their division with a 12–4 record and received a first round bye. On January 17, 2016, he made three solo tackles and forced a key fumble by Steelers' running back Fitzgerald Toussaint to set up a go-ahead touchdown drive by the Broncos and defeat the Pittsburgh Steelers. The following week, he intercepted a tipped pass by teammate Aqib Talib on a two-point conversion to preserve a fourth-quarter 20–18 victory over the New England Patriots. On February 7, 2016, Roby appeared in Super Bowl 50 and recorded two solo tackles and three pass deflections in the Broncos' 24–10 victory over the Carolina Panthers.

2016
Roby remained the third cornerback under defensive coordinator Wade Phillips for the second consecutive season. On October 30, 2016, Roby recorded a season-high seven combined tackles, deflected two passes, and returned an interception off Philip Rivers for a 49-yard touchdown during a 27–19 victory over the San Diego Chargers. It marked the first time Roby returned an interception for a touchdown. In Week 13, he collected three solo tackle, defended two passes, and returned an interception by Blake Bortles for a 51-yard touchdown in Denver's 20–10 win at the Jacksonville Jaguars. Roby finished the season with 39 combined tackles (34 solo), eight pass deflections, two interceptions, two touchdowns, and a sack in 16 games and four starts. Without quarterback Peyton Manning leading the offense, the Denver Broncos finished the  season third in the AFC West with a 9–7 record and did not qualify for the playoffs. Head coach Gary Kubiak retired after the season, citing issues with his health. The Denver Broncos' secondary was ranked fourth by Pro Football Focus. Pro Football Focus gave Roby an overall grade of 58.9, ranking him 83rd among cornerbacks in 2016.

2017
On April 18, 2017, the Denver Broncos announced they exercised the fifth-year, $8.52 million option on Roby's rookie contract. Roby remained the third cornerback behind Talib and Harris under new head coach Vance Joseph to start the 2017 regular season.

He played in the Denver Broncos' season-opener against the Los Angeles Chargers on Monday Night Football and recorded five combined tackles, two pass deflections, and intercepted a pass attempt by quarterback Philip Rivers to set up a touchdown drive by the Broncos in their 24-21 comeback victory. On November 5, 2017, Roby recorded a season-high five solo tackles and deflected a pass during a 51–23 loss at the Philadelphia Eagles. He finished the  season with 42 combined tackles (35 solo), a career-high 17 pass deflections, an interception, and one sack in 16 games and four starts. Roby played in 64 consecutive games and did not miss a game over the course of four seasons. The Denver Broncos finished last in the AFC West with a 5–11 record and did not qualify for the playoffs for the second season in a row. Pro Football Focus gave Roby an overall grade of 84.0 in 2017 and his grade ranked 25th among all cornerbacks.

2018

With Roby having impressed in his years as a backup, the general consensus heading into the 2018 season was that he was a high-quality defensive back deserving of a full-time starting role. This consensus convinced Broncos president of football operations John Elway to move on from Talib, trading him to the Rams, and to promote Roby to one of Denver's two starting cornerbacks. However, Roby had a disappointing 2018 season, as his Pro Football Focus player grade plummeted to just 59.9. His head coach publicly called him "inconsistent," and low point came when he was called out on national television in a December 24 Monday Night Football broadcast by commentator Jason Witten for perceived lack of effort.

Houston Texans
On March 14, 2019, Roby signed a one-year, $10 million contract with the Houston Texans.
Roby made his debut with the Texans in week 1 against the New Orleans Saints.  In the game, Roby made 9 tackles in the 30–28 loss.
In week 13 against the New England Patriots on Sunday Night Football, Roby recorded his first interception of the season off a pass thrown by Tom Brady and returned it for 22 yards during the 28–22 win.
In week 16 against the Tampa Bay Buccaneers, Roby intercepted a pass thrown by Jameis Winston and returned it for a 27-yard touchdown during the 23–20 win.

On April 3, 2020, Roby signed a three-year, $36 million contract with the Texans.
In Week 6 against the Tennessee Titans, Roby recorded his first interception of the season off a pass thrown by Ryan Tannehill during the 42–36 overtime loss. On November 30, 2020, Roby was suspended six games for violating the NFL's performance-enhancing drug policy.

New Orleans Saints
On September 8, 2021, Roby was traded to the New Orleans Saints in exchange for a 2022 third round selection and a conditional 2023 sixth round selection. 

On November 25, he recorded his first interception as a Saint and of the season against Josh Allen and the Buffalo Bills in a 31–6 loss on Thanksgiving.

Roby entered the 2022 season as a starting cornerback opposite Marshon Lattimore. He suffered an ankle injury in Week 7 and was placed on injured reserve on October 25, 2022. He was activated on November 26.

NFL career statistics

Personal life
Roby was raised by his mother, Betty Roby, in Suwanee, Georgia, and admires her for raising him as a single mother. His father, James Roby, was not around during his childhood. He has a dog named Young Nino, and is good friends with Steve Atwater after growing up being friends with his son, Steve Atwater Jr.

Legal issues
On July 24, 2013, Roby was arrested and charged with misdemeanor battery. The police report states that the Bloomington Police responded to a call at 2:40AM at Dunkirk Bar. When they arrived, Roby was being detained by private security after an incident where he was removed from the establishment after he attempted to start a fight with another patron. Roby re-entered the establishment to try to find his friends and was stopped by security. While being confronted, he allegedly struck the security guard in the chest and was immediately taken down by force until police arrived. On August 21, 2013, the case was conditionally dismissed after Roby pleaded guilty to misdemeanor disorderly conduct and agreed to complete a pre-trial diversion program. Under the terms of the agreement, Roby was required to stay out of legal trouble until August 16, 2014.

On April 22, 2014, Roby was charged with physical control of a motor vehicle while under the influence of drugs or alcohol from an incident that occurred on April 20. The police report filed with Franklin County court states Columbus Police responded to a call about a drunk driver of a Dodge Charger that nearly hit kids walking on the sidewalk. The officers arrived to find Roby passed out in the driver seat of his vehicle. After Roby did not respond to officers, they opened the door to the vehicle and smelled an alcohol like odor. It appeared Roby was under the influence after another officer responded and conducted a field sobriety test, which he failed. On April 29, 2014, Roby pleaded guilty to physical control of a motor vehicle while under the influence of drugs or alcohol and was charged with a suspended sentence of 180 days in jail. Under the terms of the sentence, he was required to attend a three-day driver intervention program and pay a $375 fine plus court costs.

References

External links
Denver Broncos bio
Ohio State Buckeyes bio

1992 births
Living people
People from Suwanee, Georgia
Sportspeople from the Atlanta metropolitan area
Players of American football from Georgia (U.S. state)
American football cornerbacks
Ohio State Buckeyes football players
All-American college football players
New Orleans Saints players
Denver Broncos players
Houston Texans players